The 2022 F4 Chinese Championship (Shell Helix FIA F4 Chinese Championship) was the eighth season of the F4 Chinese Championship. It began on 12 August at Ningbo International Circuit and ended on 11 December at Pingtan Street Circuit.

Teams and drivers

Race calendar and results 
The calendar featuring 4 rounds and 14 races was announced on 18 March. The revised version was published on 29 July. The Pingtan round was twice postponed, and the event was finally scheduled for  the second week of December.

Championship standings

Drivers' Championship

Teams' Cup

Notes

References

External links 
  

F4 Chinese Championship seasons
Formula 4
Chinese F4
Chinese F4